Phaeocollybia pseudolugubris is a species of fungus in the family Cortinariaceae. Found in the Popocatépetl region of México State, where it grows in forests of sacred fir (Abies religiosa) and pine, it was described as new to science in 1996 by mycologists Victor Bandala and Egon Horak. It is a member of section Versicolores in the genus Phaeocollybia. Its spores are more or less ellipsoidal to almond-shaped, typically measuring 8–9 by 4–5 µm. Clamp connections are absent from the hyphae.

References

External links

Cortinariaceae
Fungi described in 1996
Fungi of Mexico
Fungi without expected TNC conservation status